Hans L'Orange Field is a stadium in Waipahu, Hawai'i.  It is primarily used for baseball, and is the home field of Hawaii Pacific University's men's baseball team, the Sharks, since 2016. It was the home field of the Hawaii Winter Baseball teams North Shore Honu  and West Oahu CaneFires before the league folded. It holds 2,200 people.

History 
Hans L'Orange Field began as a recreation area for Oahu Sugar Co. workers. Originally known as Oahu Sugar Co. Field, it was later named after the manager who, in 1924, convinced the company to give up several acres of cane field, to create the recreation area.

The park was refurbished for Hawaii Winter Baseball in 1995. In February 2016, The City and County of Honolulu completed several improvement projects that included upgrading the irrigation system, grading the field and expanding the foul territory in right field.

References

Baseball venues in Hawaii
Minor league baseball venues
Buildings and structures in Honolulu County, Hawaii
Sports venues completed in 1924
1924 establishments in Hawaii
College baseball venues in the United States
Hawaii Pacific Sharks baseball